Thermomonosporaceae represents a Family of bacteria that share similar genotypic and phenotypic characteristics. The Family Thermomonosporaceae includes aerobic, Gram-positive, non-acid-fast, chemo-organotrophic Actinomycetota. They produce a branched substrate mycelium bearing aerial hyphae that undergo differentiation into single or short chains of arthrospores. All species of Thermomonosporaceae share the same cell wall type (type III; meso-diaminopimelic acid), a similar menaquinone profile in which MK-9(H6)is predominant, and fatty acid profile type 3a. The presence of the diagnostic sugar madurose is variable, but can be found in most species of this family. The polar lipid profiles are characterized as phospholipid type PI for most species of Thermomonospora, Actinomadura and Spirillospora. The members of Actinocorallia are characterized by phospholipid type PII.

The G+C content of the DNA lies within the range 66±72 mol%. The pattern of 16S rRNA signatures consists of nucleotides at positions 440 : 497 (C–G), 501 : 544 (C–G), 502 : 543 (G–C), 831 : 855 (G–G), 843 (U), 844 (A) and 1355 : 1367 (A–U).
The type genus is Thermomonospora

References 

Soil biology